Escape the Night is an American romantic mystery novel by Mignon G. Eberhart. It was published by Random House in 1944, and first reprinted in paperback in August, 1946, by Bantam Books.

Plot 
After four years away in New York, Serena March rekindles a romance and uncovers foul play at her sister's historic, possibly cursed, home.

Reception
The New York Times stated tepidly that "Eberhart has contrived to maintain the suspense to the very end and to provide a solution which is not too illogical."

References

External links 
Escape the Night at Goodreads
Escape the Night at My Love-Haunted Heart

1944 American novels
American mystery novels
American romance novels
Monterey, California
Novels set in California
Random House books
Novels by Mignon G. Eberhart